The Chartered Quality Institute (CQI), formerly known as The Institute of Quality Assurance (IQA), is the chartered body for quality professionals. It improves the performance of organisations by developing their capability in quality management. As a registered charity, the CQI exists to advance education in, knowledge of and the practice of quality in the industry, the public sector and the voluntary sectors.

The CQI also owns the International Register of Certificated Auditors, the world's first and largest international certification body for auditors of management systems. IRCA certifies some 10,000 auditors in over 150 countries worldwide.

It is a contributor to policy issues at a national and international level.

Activities 
CQI works to promote quality across a range of industries in both the public and private sectors, irrespective of company size. It provides training, education and support for the quality professionals and individuals responsible for quality management. It has a branch network of more than 30 local groups around the UK and three overseas as well as online communities on LinkedIn. It has its monthly magazine Qualityworld and a range of e-publications promoting quality approaches and tools.

The institute also has a network of special interest groups for members who are interested in a specific industry or quality practice. The groups include the Defence Industry Group, the Deming SIG, the Engineering SIG, the Integrated Management SIG, the Medical Technologies SIG, the Nuclear SIG and the Pharmaceutical Quality Group. The oldest and most prolific of the groups is the PQG which has published three pharmaceutical quality standards (PS 9000, PS 9001, PS 9004) and 11 monographs.

IRCA 

Formed in 1984, the International Register of Certificated Auditors (IRCA) is the world's original and largest international certification body for auditors of management systems. It certifies more than 15,000 auditors in over 150 countries worldwide. IRCA provides auditors, business and industry with two main services:

1. certification of auditors of management systems. These include:

 consultants assisting organizations to develop and implement quality management systems
 certification body/registrar auditors, auditing organizations against ISO 9001 and other management system standards
 internal auditors, performing audits on suppliers or auditing their own organisations
 quality managers

2. approval of training organizations and certification of their auditor training courses.
 IRCA has approved over 90 training organisations, who together provide training for over 50,000 students each year in more than 100 countries.

IRCA offers certification programmes that recognise the competence of auditors who audit quality, software development, aerospace, maritime safety, pharmaceutical, food safety, environmental,  information security, information technology service, occupational health and safety, social systems and business continuity management systems.

History

The CQI's roots date back to the early days of engineering inspection during the First World War. After frequent accidental detonations in munitions factories, the UK government created the Ministry of Munitions, which placed inspectors in factories to ensure procedures were being followed correctly. In 1919, the institute was first known as the Technical Inspection Association when it attended a conference held by Woolwich Royal Arsenal's Inspection Department in London. The institute began with 500 members and was originally headquartered at its secretary's office at 44 Bedford Row, London WC1.

On 10 November 1922 the TIA reformed as the Institution of Engineering Inspection, so that it could be open to industrial inspectors and inspectors employed by the UK government. In 1929, the institute's branch network was formed, with local groups meeting all over the UK. Throughout the 1930s, the profession developed further with the discovery of statistical quality control and in the 1940s the progression to 'quality control' rather than simple inspection. In March 1944, one member expressed concern at the loose way in which the term 'quality control' was being used. He then went on to propose that the IEI should be renamed 'The Institution of Quality Engineering', but this proposal met with opposition and was dropped.

In 1954 the British Productivity Council proposed either the formation of a Society for Quality Control, or that quality control should be incorporated as a branch of an existing society. The institute's council agreed that it would be prepared to incorporate quality control and agreed that those interested in quality might be allowed to join the institute. On 22 December 1955, an extraordinary general meeting approved changes to the constitution, so it effectively admitted quality control as a partner with engineering inspection. Its title remained the Institution of Engineering Inspection, but its objectives included: 'To promote and encourage the practice of engineering inspection and quality control in industry.

The institute began to consider offering professional qualifications in 1958. By autumn of 1960, the institute had formed an education committee and offered technical colleges a lecture entitled 'the place and function of the inspector in engineering'. Examinations started in the summer of 1960 with nine candidates. This number increased to 21 in 1961, and by 1963, it had reached 106. In 1965, the institute had completely revised and relaunched its whole examination structure. In a profession in which the majority had, in the past, acquired their knowledge and skill by experience on the job, it had taken some years to raise the examination to the academic standards then set by the institute.

In 1965 the institute decided that a change in name was desirable on the basis that the institute was concerned with the much wider spectrum of quality assurance and many people working in quality were not engineers. After seeking the opinion of the branches, the council gave its approval by 17 votes to 0, but the Board of Trade was unable to accept the proposed name of the Institution of Quality Technology. It was not until 1972 that the institute was able to get general agreement and changed its name to the title Institute of Quality Assurance. This choice was reinforced by a glossary of terms, newly issued by the British Standards Institution, which defined quality assurance as 'all activities and functions concerned with the attainment of quality'. Throughout the 1970s the institute worked with the Ministry of Defence and industry to try and establishing a common approval system for quality and giving certificates of competence to successful companies.

By 1980 the institute had a membership of 5,400 members which doubled by the end of the decade. Early on in the 1980s the institute merged with the National Council for Quality and Reliability and in 1981 the IQA formed a corporate bodies arm with the British Quality Association.

In 1988 the IQA launched it first diplomas in quality assurance to increase the status of the quality profession and improve accessibility to quality skills. The next year the institute celebrated the first World Quality Day on 11 November and the institute's international membership was boosted by the development of a Singapore branch.

The 1990s saw the BQA break away from the IQA to form the British Quality Foundation. This was a result of the Henderson Committee report which recommended a prestigious quality award for industry in the UK, following the success of the Malcolm Baldrige National Quality Award in the US. The BQA was seen as the natural candidate to run the award, but felt it was not well placed to do so due to its ties to the IQA. At the end of 1992 the BQA was wound up and the BQF started as an independent organisation.

The Hong Kong Branch of the IQA/CQI was established in 1991 with the assistance of the Industry Department of the Hong Kong Government and the Hong Kong Quality Assurance Agency.

The 2000s brought substantial changes within the institute, with changes to the membership criteria, the launch of the Small Business Standard and the petition to the Privy Council for chartered status. In September 2006 the IQA was finally awarded a Royal Charter and commenced operating as the Chartered Quality Institute on 1 January 2007. Individual chartered status followed in 2008 and there are now more than 4,700 Chartered Quality Professionals working in the UK and beyond. Existing Members and Fellows commit to undertaking Continuous Professional Development to ensure currency of their skills and knowledge. The grade uses the post-nominal letters as CQP MCQI or CQP FCQI. The CQI was also a founder member of the European Organization for Quality, although it resigned from its membership in 2009.

See also
British Quality Foundation
European Organization for Quality
International Register of Certificated Auditors
United Kingdom Accreditation Service

References

External links

1919 establishments in the United Kingdom
Holborn
Non-profit organisations based in the United Kingdom
Organisations based in the London Borough of Camden
Quality
Quality